Miguel Cané (born 9 June 1974) is a Mexican actor and journalist, who began as a child actor in the 1980s. Notable films include Otra vuelta de tuerca (1981), Mariana, Mariana (1987) and an uncredited role as a boy in David Lynch's Dune (1984). Today he earns a living as a newspaper editor in Mexico City.

References

External links
 

Mexican male film actors
Mexican male child actors
Mexican journalists
Male journalists
1974 births
Living people